Aatish Lubah (born 3 November 1995) is a Mauritian badminton player. He was one of the 14 players selected for the Road to Rio Program, a program that aimed to help African badminton players to compete at the 2016 Olympic Games. Lubah competed at the 2014 and 2018 Commonwealth Games.

Lubah was a gold medalists at the 2015 Africa Games in the team event, and in 2019 in the men's doubles event.

Achievements

African Games 
Men's doubles

African Championships 
Men's singles

Men's doubles

BWF International Challenge/Series (4 titles, 6 runners-up) 
Men's singles

Men's doubles

  BWF International Challenge tournament
  BWF International Series tournament
  BWF Future Series tournament

References

External links 
 
 
 

1995 births
Living people
People from Rivière du Rempart District
Mauritian male badminton players
Badminton players at the 2014 Commonwealth Games
Badminton players at the 2018 Commonwealth Games
Badminton players at the 2022 Commonwealth Games
Commonwealth Games competitors for Mauritius
Competitors at the 2015 African Games
Competitors at the 2019 African Games
African Games gold medalists for Mauritius
African Games medalists in badminton